Thambathyam is a 1987 Indian Tamil-language film, directed by K. Vijayan and produced by T. S. Kalyani. The film stars Sivaji Ganesan, Ambika and Radha. It is a remake of the Telugu film Dampatyam.

Plot 
Dr. Sathyamoorthy is a renowned heart surgeon with a loving wife, Janaki, as well as two daughters, Jyothi and Aruna. Janaki's father also lives with the family. Janaki is the loving but forgetful matriarch and the family abides by her wishes in most things. Jyothi falls for an aspiring lawyer. Aruna is a reporter who falls in love with inspector Venkatesh who's searching for his sister Latha's murderer. Sathyamoorthy and Janaki approve of their daughters respective loves and arrange the weddings. While wedding shopping, Sathyamoorthy runs into Jaggu an old acquaintance with an ax to grind. He goes to Venkatesh with proof that Sathyamoorthy killed Latha. Sathyamoorthy is arrested and the happy family is thrown into disarray. The rest of the family must now uncover the truth behind Latha's murder.

Cast 
Sivaji Ganesan as Sathyamoorthy
Ambika as Janaki
Radha as Latha
Tulasi as Aruna
 Kalaiselvi  as Jyothi
V. K. Ramasamy as Shanthi's grandfather
Prasath as Jaganathan (Jaggu)
Vennira Aadai Moorthy
Pandiyan
Janarthanan as inspector Venkatesh

Soundtrack 
Soundtrack was composed by Manoj–Gyan.
"Sonna Kelunga" - Surendar, Uma Ramanan
"Geetham Vandhudhu" - Vani Jairam, Malaysia Vasudevan
"Kannane" - Vani Jairam, Vijay Ramani
"Nenjil Oru Raagam" - Vani Jairam

References

External links 
 

1987 films
1980s Tamil-language films
Tamil remakes of Telugu films
Films scored by Manoj–Gyan
Films directed by K. Vijayan
1987 drama films